(born April 21, 1976) is a retired Japanese male freestyle and medley swimmer. He represented his Japan in two consecutive Summer Olympics, starting in 1992. His best Olympic result was the 10th place (4:23.36) in the Men's 400m Individual Medley event at the 1996 Summer Olympics.

References
 sports-reference

1976 births
Living people
Olympic swimmers of Japan
Swimmers at the 1992 Summer Olympics
Swimmers at the 1996 Summer Olympics
Universiade medalists in swimming
Universiade bronze medalists for Japan
Japanese male freestyle swimmers
Japanese male medley swimmers
Medalists at the 1997 Summer Universiade
20th-century Japanese people